Sakoli is a city and a municipal council in Bhandara district in the Indian state of Maharashtra.
It is connected with NH-53 and NH-353C.

Geography

Sakoli (साकोली) is located at 21.08° N ×79.98° E. It has an average elevation of 233 metres (767 feet).
It is located on Mumbai-Kolkata National Highway 6. Sakoli is well surrounded by lake, ponds, and hills [of small to medium heights].  Approximately two to three  km from the city the Chulbhand river flows. The Gondumari Palace is just 10 km away from the city.  It is of historical importance due to the presence of zamindari kingdom—memorials of them can still be found today. Two important tourist points, viz., Nagzira National Park and Navegaon Bandh Bird Sanctuary are very close to the city, making it as visitors' the only convenient place.

Transport
Sakoli is well connected to the major and minor cities. It lies along National Highway 6, which mainly connects Mumbai and Kolkata (via Nagpur, Raipur). Other cities like Gondia, Gadchiroli, Chandrapur etc., are also well-connected through roads and/or rails. Soundad (10 km) & Gondia Junction(60 km) and Nagpur Junction (105 km) are the nearest major railway stations. Another railways station of importance is Saundad (convenient place to go by train to Gondia and Chandrapur). The nearest airport is Nagpur International Airport (120 km)

Education
The city has good education facilities ranging from kindergarten to university degrees. This city has several schools (Marathi and English), high schools (five Marathi, one English), and one government polytechnic college. Many other degree colleges including, B.Pharm., B.A, M.A, B.Sc., M.SC, B-com, M-com, D.Ed., D.Pharm., physical educational institute, nursing institutes, etc. Sakoli is well known in the Bhandara District for the quality education.

Culture
People of many religions can be found at Sakoli. Few temples of Lord Durga, Lord Ganesha, Buddha Vihar, mosque can be found in the city. The religious festivals, such as—to name few, Gudi Padva, Bouddha-pournima, Rama Navami, Hanuman Jayanti, Dr. Ambedkar Jayanti, Ashadhi and Kartiki Ekadashis, Gokulashtami, Poda, Ganesh Chaturthi, Durga Puja, Saraswati Puja, Gauripujan, Dasara, Divali, Holi, Muharram, Ramzan Id and Bakr-Id, and few fairs are observed.

References 

Cities and towns in Bhandara district
Talukas in Maharashtra